The 19th Legislative Assembly of Puerto Rico will meet from January 2, 2021, to January 1, 2025. Members of the 31st House of Representatives of Puerto Rico were elected in the 2020 House of Representatives election, while members of the 27th Senate of Puerto Rico were elected the same day in the Senate election. The Popular Democratic Party (PPD in Spanish) does not have an outright majority in the Senate, but controls the chamber. While the PPD had a simple majority of representatives in the 31st House of Representatives from 2021 to 2022, this has ceased to be the case since 4 May 2022.

Major legislation
The following is a non-extensive list of legislation with far-reaching impact in Puerto Rican society approved by the 19th Legislative Assembly. For an extensive list of all legislation approved in this legislature see List of acts of the 19th Legislative Assembly of Puerto Rico.

Enacted
 Law 10 of 2022: Special Law for the Minimum Salary of Teachers in the Public Education System. Increased the minimum salary for teachers to $2,750 monthly.

 Law 47 of 2021: Puerto Rico Minimum Wage Act.  The law increased the minimum wage from 7.25 to $10.50 per hour (or higher) by 1 July 2024; allows Puerto Rico’s minimum wage to prevail over the federal minimum wage if Puerto Rico's is higher; created the Minimum Wage Review Commission within the Department of Labor and Human Resources which will review and increase the minimum wage yearly via decrees; and provided  employees of local businesses not covered by the Fair Labor Standards Act of 1938 with protections.

 Law 7 of 2021: Dignified Retirement Act.  Declares a state of emergency for the government of Puerto Rico and its pension systems, proposes a model to manage creditors' classes under a Plan of Adjustment of Puerto Rico's public debts, setting a goal for zero pension cuts, as well as rejecting prima facie any Plan of Adjustment or Restructuring Support Agreement proposed by the Financial Oversight and Management Board for Puerto Rico that requires the cutting of essential public services by the central government and public corporations or the municipalities.

Proposed
 Senate Bill 693: Law for the Protection of the Conceived in its Gestational Stage of Viability. Would remove or restrict medical exemptions from the abortion section of the Puerto Rico penal code as recognized in Pueblo de Puerto Rico v. Pablo Duarte Mendoza (1980). The Senate approved it on 21 June 2022, by a vote of 16 for, 9 against, one abstained and one absent. It has been referred to the House of Representatives, and awaits consideration.

 House Bill 1037: To amend Section 404 (a) of the Puerto Rico Controlled Substances Act, Act No. 4 of 23 June 1971, as amended, for the purpose of decriminalizing the simple possession of fourteen (14) grams or less of marijuana. Would have decriminalized possession of small amounts of marijuana. Puerto Rico currently allows medical marijuana use and sales, but not recreational marijuana use. Failed to pass in the House of Representatives on 1 November 2022, by a vote of 19 for, 26 against, 2 abstained, 3 absent.

Leadership

Senate

House of Representatives

Party summary
 Resignations and new members are discussed in the "Changes in membership" section below.

Senate

House of Representatives
{| width=300px align=right
|-
| 
|}

Changes in membership

Senate

House of Representatives

Notes

References

External links

 Puerto Rico State Elections Commission 
 Puerto Rico Senate 
 Puerto Rico House of Representatives 

Puerto Rico, 19th Legislative Assembly
19